The 31st Scripps National Spelling Bee was held in Washington, District of Columbia on June 11–12, 1958, by the E.W. Scripps Company.

The winner was 14-year-old eighth-grader Jolitta Schlehuber of McPherson, Kansas, sponsored by the Topeka Daily Capital. She correctly spelled the word syllepsis. She had placed fourth the prior year, and was the first winner from Kansas. Second place went to Terry Madeira of Elizabethtown, Pennsylvania, who misspelled propylaeum. A talent scout for The $64,000 Question game show in the audience invited Schlehuber to appear on that show, where she won $8000, which she used to pay college tuition.

After the last year's bee had taken almost 10 hours, this was the first time the bee was put on a two-day program. There were 68 contestants this year, 27 boys and 41 girls. Forty-eight spellers were eliminated in eleven rounds in the first day of competition on Wednesday, June 11, leaving 12 girls and 8 boys for the second and final day of competition. Benson S. Alleman was pronouncer.

The top prize was $1,000, with $500 for second, $250 for third, $100 for the next five, $50 for the next ten, and $25 each for the rest.

References

Scripps National Spelling Bee competitions
1958 in education
1958 in Washington, D.C.
June 1958 events in the United States